Michael Dennis Kelleher (born July 25, 1947) is an American former professional baseball player and coach. He played in Major League Baseball for the St. Louis Cardinals, Houston Astros, Chicago Cubs, Detroit Tigers, and California Angels. He coached for the Pittsburgh Pirates, Tigers, and the New York Yankees.

Career

Minor Leagues
As a minor leaguer with the Tulsa Oilers in 1972, Kelleher set an American Association record for shortstops with a .979 fielding percentage.

Playing career
Kelleher's contract was sold by the Cardinals to the Astros on October 26, 1973.

His most notable moment as an active major-league player happened in the second inning of a 9–4 Cubs win over the San Diego Padres in the second game of a doubleheader at Wrigley Field on August 7, 1977. The 5–9, 170-pound Kelleher fought 6–6, 210-pound Dave Kingman who had successfully broken up a double-play attempt with a hard slide after being hit by a Steve Renko pitch. The ensuing bench-clearing brawl resulted in the ejections of both Kelleher and Kingman. The two became teammates the following season, after Kingman signed with the Cubs as a free agent.

In 11 seasons, Kelleher was an infielder for the St. Louis Cardinals (1972–73 and 1975), Houston Astros (1974), Chicago Cubs (1976–80), Detroit Tigers (1981–82) and California Angels (1982).  He was a member of the 1982 AL Western Division Champions, playing mostly shortstop and hitting .163 in 49 at bats. He did not appear in the playoffs.  Playing in 622 games, Kelleher recorded a career .213 batting average in 1,081 at bats.  He is the most recently retired non-pitcher to have more than 1,000 at-bats and no home runs.

Coaching career
Kelleher consistently worked in major league baseball after his playing career ended. He was a minor league coach and a scout. Prior to being named first base coach for the Yankees, he was a defensive coordinator for the Yankees’ minor league system. His main assignment with the Yankees was originally to monitor the development of Robinson Canó, whom he coached in the minor leagues. He spent six seasons as the team's first base coach, and was a member of their coaching staff during the 2009 World Series.

On October 10, the Yankees announced Kelleher would not return for the 2015 season. Kelleher subsequently retired from baseball on October 20.

References

External links

1947 births
Living people
Arkansas Travelers players
Baseball players from Seattle
California Angels players
Cedar Rapids Cardinals players
Chicago Cubs players
Denver Bears players
Detroit Tigers coaches
Detroit Tigers players
Houston Astros players
Iowa Cubs managers
Las Vegas Stars (baseball) players
Leones del Caracas players
American expatriate baseball players in Venezuela
Major League Baseball first base coaches
Major League Baseball infielders
Modesto Reds players
New York Yankees coaches
New York Yankees scouts
Pittsburgh Pirates coaches
Puget Sound Loggers baseball players
St. Louis Cardinals players
Tulsa Oilers (baseball) players